Beth Shalom or Beth Sholom ( "house of peace") may refer to:

Synagogues

Canada
Beth Shalom Synagogue (Edmonton), Alberta
Temple Emanu-El-Beth Sholom (Montreal, Quebec)

Cuba
Beth Shalom Temple (Havana, Cuba)

Greece
Beth Shalom Synagogue (Athens)

United Kingdom
Beth Shalom Reform Synagogue (Cambridge)

United States

California
Valley Beth Shalom  (Encino, California)

Connecticut
Beth Shalom Rodfe Zedek (Chester, Connecticut)

Florida
Temple Beth Sholom (Miami Beach, Florida)

Illinois
Beth Shalom B'nai Zaken Ethiopian Hebrew Congregation (Chicago, Illinois)

Iowa
Beit Shalom Jewish Community (Davenport, Iowa)

Maryland
Beth Shalom Congregation (Columbia, Maryland)
Beth Sholom Congregation (Frederick, Maryland)
Beth Sholom Congregation and Talmud Torah (Potomac, Maryland)

New Jersey
Temple Beth Sholom (Cherry Hill, New Jersey)

New York
 Congregation Beth Shalom (Clifton Park, New York)

Pennsylvania
Beth Sholom Congregation (Elkins Park, Pennsylvania)
Congregation Beth Shalom (Pittsburgh, Pennsylvania)

Rhode Island
Congregation Beth Sholom (Providence, Rhode Island)

Other

Beth Shalom Holocaust Centre (Nottinghamshire, United Kingdom)

See also